Choe Yong-gon may refer to:

 Choe Yong-gon (army commander) (1900–1976), Korean and North Korean military leader
 Choe Yong-gon (vice-premier) (born c. 1952, possibly died 2015), North Korean politician